Asmaa Rhlalou is a Moroccan journalist and politician of the National Rally of Independents(RNI). She has been a member of the Moroccan Parliament and was elected as the mayor of the Moroccan capital Rabat by the municipal council in September 2021.

Early life and education 
She enrolled in the French University of Perpignan, from which she obtained a doctorate from the faculty of economics in 2006.

Journalistic career 
She has been writing for the L'Opinion since 1997, besides she was a reporter for the Arabic language MBC group for two years.

Political career 
Since the age of fifteen years, she was politically active. She was involved in the Istiqlal party for ten years and in 2015 she was invited to join the RNI for which she was elected into the Moroccan Parliament for the term 2016 to 2021. As a deputy of Morocco she represented Morocco in the Women's Political leader's summit in Reykyavik in 2017 and Tokyo in 2019. Following her parties success in the General elections in September 2021, she was elected as the mayor of Rabat by the municipal council supported by a broad coalition of the RNI, Istiqlal, Authenticity and Modernity Party (PAM).

References 

Living people
Women mayors of places in Morocco
Moroccan journalists
Moroccan women journalists
21st-century journalists
21st-century Moroccan women writers
21st-century Moroccan women politicians
21st-century Moroccan politicians
Year of birth missing (living people)